Wake, Rattle, and Roll (retitled Jump, Rattle, and Roll when it aired on The Disney Channel on weekday afternoons in 1991) is an American live-action/animated television series produced by Hanna-Barbera Productions and Four Point Entertainment that premiered in the fall of 1990. As the show's title suggests, Hanna-Barbera intended the show to air on its affiliated stations in a morning timeslot before school. The show's title was inspired by the song "Shake, Rattle and Roll". After its single season on the air in syndication, Wake, Rattle, and Roll moved exclusively to The Disney Channel under the title Jump, Rattle, and Roll, with the title adjustment due to its repeats not being confined to mornings.

Jump, Rattle, and Roll ran on The Disney Channel from October 7, 1991 to 1994, becoming the only Hanna-Barbera animated series ever to air on that network. It has also been screened on Network Ten in Australia, TV1 in Malaysia, Channel 2 in New Zealand, M-Net in South Africa, Channel 5 in Singapore and TV5 in the Philippines while the animated segments were broadcast on ITV in the UK as part of the short running Saturday morning children's programme TV Mayhem, becoming the first series to debut on ITV during TV Mayhem.

Plot
The series was about a boy named Sam Baxter (played by R. J. Williams) and his robot D.E.C.K.S. (voiced by Rob Paulsen; built from old audio/video equipment and a Sony U-Matic videotape head; the name was an acronym for Digital Electronic Cassette-Headed Kinetic System) and their adventures in the basement, which has a time machine that can bring back historical figures. In some cases, Sam and D.E.C.K.S. occasionally have remote fights in which they each have a remote control and start pressing buttons changing each other from Hanna-Barbera stars to famous movie stars.

Basement tech
Sam's grandpa Dr. Lester T. Quirk (played by Avery Schreiber) is a brilliant inventor and is constantly supplying Sam and DECKS with sci-fi technology to add to their basement bedroom:

 People Processor – A teleporter used to send or retrieve people to and from anywhere in the world. Sometimes, it could even send people through time.
 Mondo-View – A supercomputer that was used for several reasons on the show. For example, Sam is able to talk to Grandpa Quirk anywhere in the world.
 Debbie Detector – A video monitor used by Sam and DECKS to communicate with Sam's older sister Debbie (played by Terri Ivens) which lessens the amount of time Debbie spends in the basement. It often makes an alarm sound when she approaches.

Cartoon segments
After a short live-action skit, D.E.C.K.S. would turn on the television screen on his torso and display an animated short. There are two new Hanna-Barbera series made exclusively for this program.

Monster Tails
Monster Tails is about a group of pets who live in a castle in Transylvania with their guardian Igor Jr. (voiced by Charlie Adler), the son of Igor (Iggy for short). Each of them had a similar personality to their masters who are in Hollywood making movies:

 Frankenmutt (voiced by Frank Welker) – The Frankenstein Monster's dog. He has incredible strength, organ-playing abilities, and the brain of a genius (literally).
 Elsa (voiced by Pat Musick) – The Bride of Frankenstein's dog. Elsa has the brain of a parrot and a crush on Frankenmutt.
 Catula (voiced by Charlie Adler) – Count Dracula's cat. Although Catula is arrogant, he is a master of magic and transformations (usually).
 Mumphrey (voiced by Frank Welker impersonating Woody Allen) – The Mummy's dog who is a constant insomniac.
 Dr. Veenie (voiced by Jonathan Winters) – Dr. Jekyll's dog who is a brilliant scientist. But whenever he sneezes, he transforms into the super-strong (but berserk) Mr. Snyde (who is like Dr. Jekyll's evil alter ego, Mr. Hyde).
 Angel (voiced by Pat Musick) – The Creature from the Black Lagoon's goldfish. Angel is a ghost because she was eaten by a shark and tends to shout at certain times.

Monster Tails was also shown in the U.K., on Channel 4's The Big Breakfast in 1993.

Episodes 

 "Pet Styles of the Rich and Gruesome" – The pets are featured on a TV show called "Pet Styles of the Rich and Gruesome".
 "Purple Brain" –
 "Elsa Dearest" – After ingesting a formula made by Mr. Snyde, Elsa becomes evil and obsessed with cleaning, annoying Catula, Frankenmutt, Iggy, and Dr. Veeny.
 "Sleepwalk, Don't Run" – While trying to sleep, Mumfrey sleepwalks, getting him and his fellow monster pets into calamity.
 "Journey to the Center of Iggy" –
 "To Leech His Own"- Catula tries to rid the castle of a leech that has been drinking up his tomato juice supply.
 "The Moatside Bassanova" – A moat monster becomes obsessed with romancing Angel, who does not want anything to do with him.
 "Mighty Iggy at the Bat" –
 "Pet-refined Fortress" –
 "Monster Olympics" –
 "Driving Mr. Iggy" –
 "Ma Igor" –
 "Curse of the Mumphrey" –
 "Mayhem" –  The pets play a board game so forbidden that their masters forbade them to play. As they play the game, they soon find out it has a mind of its own.
 "Mumphrey's the Word" –
 "Garbage Mouth" –
 "Tse-tse, Tse-tse, Goodbye" –
 "Goodbye, Mr. Chump" –
 "The Minus Touch" –
 "Dr. Veenie's Beanie" –
 "Night of the Living Food" –
 "Mumphrey's Big Sleep" –
 "The Flea" –
 "Attack of the Monster Shadows" –
 "Luck, Don't Leap" –
 "The Counter Mental Divide" –
 "Dog Date Afternoon" –
 "That Darn Yarn" –
 "New Corpses on the Slab" – Dr. Veenie, Frankenmutt, and Catula become a rock band called New Corpses on the Slab when Iggy was unable to get tickets for the Graveyard Gang's concert.

Fender Bender 500
This was a spin-off of Wacky Races for the 1990s, in which classic Hanna-Barbera characters drove monster trucks made for racing. Each vehicle had a different theme, specific to its drivers; e.g., Yogi & Boo Boo's monster truck was a motorized giant picnic basket on wheels, while Winsome Witch's monster truck was a wheeled cauldron with a sentient skeleton named Axel on it. Game show announcer from The New Hollywood Squares and disc jockey Shadoe Stevens provided the voice of the race announcer. Since they were in the aforementioned series, Dastardly and Muttley reprised their roles as cheaters with their own monster truck called the Dirty Truckster, which was basically their Mean Machine on a monster truck chassis. Although the segment was not a series of its own, this was the fourth all-star sports show from Hanna-Barbera.

Axel has a cameo appearance in the Jellystone! episode "Face of the Town."

Competitors (listed by numeral order) included:

 Yogi and Boo-Boo Bear in the Jellystone Jammer (#1)
 Huckleberry Hound and Snagglepuss in the Half Dog, Half Cat, Half Track (#2)
 Wally Gator and Magilla Gorilla in the Swamp Stoner (#3)
 Top Cat and Choo-Choo in the Alley Cat (#4)
 Quick Draw McGraw and Baba Looey in the Texas Twister (#5)
 Pixie and Dixie in the Cheddar Shredder (#6)
 Augie Doggie and Doggie Daddy in the Lucky Trucky (#7)
 Winsome Witch and her cat Lucky in the Sonic Broom (#13)
 Dick Dastardly and Muttley in the Dirty Truckster (#00)

Episodes
 "The Nippon Tuck 500" – The racers competed in a race in Japan. Won by Top Cat and Choo-Choo. The prize was a model of a mountain.
 "The Cow, Sow & Plow 500" – The racers competed in a race in the rural U.S. countryside. Won by Augie Doggie and Doggie Daddy. The prize was a lifetime supply of blackberry preserves, much to Yogi Bear's chagrin, who proceeded to complain about not getting his pie before getting a pie thrown into his face.
 "The Calypso 500" – The racers competed in a race on a Spanish island. Won by Augie Doggie and Doggie Daddy. Dick Dastardly stole their treasure chest prize, not knowing that there were balloons in it, as the announcer stated something dealing with "da balloons" which Dick misunderstood as "golden doubloons".
 "The Philly Freedom 500" – The racers competed in a race in Philadelphia, Pennsylvania. Won by Pixie and Dixie. The prize is the Spirit of 76.
 "The Hup, Two, Three, Four, 500" – The racers competed in a race that goes through a military course as some of them are put through military training. Won by Top Cat and Choo-Choo. The prize was a bowling ball.
 "The Francs a Lot 500" – The racers competed in a race in France. Won by Yogi and Boo-Boo Bear. The prize was 500 “franks”, as in hot dogs.
 "The Wooden Shoe Like to Win 500" – The racers competed in a race in Holland/the Netherlands. Won by Quick Draw McGraw and Baba Looey.
 "The Rocket Gibraltar 500" – The racers competed in a race on the Isle of Gibraltar. Won by Huckleberry Hound and Snagglepuss.
 "The Bombay Flambe 500" – The racers competed in a race in Mumbai, India. Won by Winsome Witch and Lucky. At the beginning of the race, Dick thought that the prize had something not to be "sorry" about, thinking it was riches. However, the prize turned out to be a sari.
 "The Way Down Under 500" – The racers competed in a race in Australia. Won by Augie Doggie and Doogie Daddy.
 "The Fondue 500" – The racers competed in a race to Switzerland. Winners: Unknown
 "The Kenya Win It 500" – The racers competed in a race in Africa. Won by Augie Doggie and Doogie Daddy. The prize was a five hundred carat diamond gem.
 "The Fettuccini 500" – The racers competed in a race in Italy. Won by Top Cat and Choo-Choo.
 "The Monumental 500" – The racers competed in a race in Washington, D.C. Won by Huckleberry Hound and Snagglepuss. The prize was the "seal" of approval.
 "The High Stakes 500" – The racers competed in a race that goes from the Hoover Dam to Las Vegas. Won by Quick Draw McGraw and Baba Looey. Although Dick Dastardly and Muttley were seen crossing the finish line, Huckleberry Hound informed them that the actual winners had crossed the finish line an hour ago.
 "The Great Golden Gate 500" – The racers competed in a race in California. Won by Top Cat and Choo-Choo.
 "The Highland Fling 500" – The racers competed in a race in Scotland. Won by Winsome Witch and Lucky. The prize was a honeypot.
 "The Rush to Rushmore 500" – The racers competed in a race to Mount Rushmore. Won by Yogi and Boo-Boo Bear. The prize was a bag of beans.
 "The Pound for Pound 500" – The racers competed in a race in London. Won by Huckleberry Hound and Snagglepuss. The prize was tea for two.
 "The Great Greek 500" – The racers competed in a race in Greece. Won by Quick Draw McGraw and Baba Looey. The prize was a statue of Dick Dastardly and Muttley.
 "The Log Jammer 500" – The racers competed in a race in Oregon. Won by Yogi and Boo-Boo Bear. The prize was a palatschinke.
 "The Clambake 500"– The racers competed in a race along New England. Won by Yogi and Boo-Boo Bear. The prize was a bowl full of clams.
 "The We’ll Get Bayou 500" – The racers competed in a race in Louisiana. Won by Wally Gator and Magilla Gorilla. The prize was a shrimp.
 "The Funhouse 500" – The racers competed in a race that goes from a canyon to Wacky World carnival. Won by Huckleberry Hound and Snagglepuss. The prize was a toy box with a clown in it.
 "The Space Race 500" – The racers competed in a race at Cape Canaveral. Won by Yogi and Boo-Boo Bear. The prize was a picnic basket full of space food.
 "The Wicki Wacki 500" – The racers competed in a race in Hawaii. Won by Winsome Witch and Lucky.
 "The Big Apple 500" – The racers competed in a race in New York City. Won by Huckleberry Hound and Snagglepuss. The prize was a big apple.
 "The Panda-Monium 500" – The racers competed in a race in China. Won by Pixie and Dixie. Unfortunately, Dick Dastardly stole their fortune cookie prize, thinking it had riches, but the fortune read "Cheaters never prosper..."
 "The Tumbleweed 500" – The racers competed in a race in Texas. Won by Quick Draw McGraw and Baba Looey. The prize was chili.
 "The Jungle Bungle 500" – The racers competed in a race in the Amazon Rainforest. Won by Quick Draw McGraw and Baba Looey. The prize was a planting of a rainforest tree.
 "The Silver Screen 500" – The racers competed in a race in Hollywood, California. Won by Huckleberry Hound and Snagglepuss.
 "The Sheik to Sheik 500" – The racers competed in a race in the Arabian Desert. Won by Huckleberry Hound and Snagglepuss. The prize was a jug of water. 
 "The Cotton Pickin’ 500" – The racers competed in a race in the southeastern United States. Won by Wally Gator and Magilla Gorilla.
 "The Oom-pa-pah 500" – The racers competed in a race in Germany. Won by Pixie and Dixie. The prize was braunschweiger sausage, which they did not eat because of the bratwurst that they ate earlier in the race.
 "The Fountain of Youth 500" – The racers competed in a race in the Okefenokee Swamp. Won by Augie Doggie and Doggie Daddy. The prize was the Fountain of Youth.
 "The Fiesta Fantastica 500" – The racers competed in a race in Mexico. Won by Quick Draw McGraw and Baba Looey. The prize was an enchilada.
 "The Big Top 500" – The racers competed in a race at a circus. Won by Top Cat and Choo-Choo. The prize was two red clown noses.
 "The Russian Around 500" – The racers competed in a race in Russia. Won by Dick Dastardly and Muttley. The prize was a piece of red square paper, much to Dick's dismay.
 "The Dash to Nashville 500" – The racers competed in a race in Nashville. Won by Winsome Witch and Lucky.
 "The Trans-Transylvania 500" – The racers competed in a race in Transylvania. Won by Winsome Witch and Lucky. The prize was a bat in a cage, which was a "monster" of a prize.
 "The Run Down to Ghost Town 500" – Location and Winners: Unknown
 "The Go for the Gold 500" – The racers competed in a race in northern California. Winners: Unknown
 "The Golden State 500" – The racers competed in a race in San Francisco, California. Won by Top Cat and Choo-Choo.
 "The Hit'n Mississippi 500" – The racers competed in a race along the Mississippi River. Won by Wally Gator and Magilla Gorilla. The prize was a mini-soda.
 "The Alligator Alley 500" – The racers competed in a race along the Florida Everglades. Won by Wally Gator and Magilla Gorilla.
 "The Brazilian Million 500" – The racers competed in a race in Brazil. Won by Top Cat and Choo-Choo. The prize was R$1,000,000.
 "The Emerald Isle 500" – The racers competed in a race in Ireland. Won by Huckleberry Hound and Snagglepuss. The prize was a leprechaun.
 "The Nile a Minute 500" – The racers competed in a race in Egypt. Won by Winsome Witch and Lucky. The prize was a blind date.
 "The Unfathomable 500" – The racers competed in a race at the bottom of the ocean. Won by Yogi and Boo-Boo Bear. The prize was a lifetime visit to an all-you-can-eat seafood restaurant, causing Yogi to get excited. Unfortunately, the restaurant was located in Atlantis.
 "The Yukon Win It 500" – The racers competed in a race in Canada. Won by Augie Doggie and Doggie Daddy.

Filler segments 
Due to the Disney Channel airing the program without any commercial breaks due to being a premium service at the time, an additional animated segment aired after the last live-action scene. These consisted of two shorts from the H-B archive: a "Dino and Cavemouse" segment from The Flintstone Comedy Show and an "Undercover Elephant" segment from CB Bears.

Cast
 R. J. Williams – Sam Baxter
 Rob Paulsen – D.E.C.K.S., Rewind (voice)
 Ebonie Smith – K.C.
 Terri Ivens – Debbie Baxter
 Avery Schreiber – Grandpa Lester T. Quirk
 Tim Lawrence – D.E.C.K.S. (lead puppeteer)
 Allen Coulter – D.E.C.K.S. (puppeteer)
 Marc L. Tyler – D.E.C.K.S. (puppeteer)
 Adrienne Barbeau – Mrs. Baxter (voice)

Guest cast
 Danny Lee Clark – Nitro
 Ami Dolenz – Herself
 Adam G. – Chief White Eagle
 Mark Hardrive – Computer Virus
 Gary Marks – Gustarve Eiffel
 Robert Munns – Julius Caesar
 Angil Nigam – Nutinkaumn
 Sinbad – Himself
 Charles Stransky – Private Eye
 Andrea Thompson – Decksella

Voice cast
Monster Tails:
 Charlie Adler – Igor Jr., Catula
 Tim Curry – Ronald Chump
 Richard Gautier – Malcolm Milkem
 Pat Musick – Elsa, Angel
 Frank Welker – Frankenmutt, Mumfrey
 Jonathan Winters – Dr. Veenie/Mr. Snyde, Harry Mutsnatcher

Fender Bender 500:
 Greg Burson – Yogi Bear, Huckleberry Hound, Quick Draw McGraw, Snagglepuss
 Marvin Kaplan – Choo-Choo
 John Mariano – Wally Gator
 Allan Melvin – Magilla Gorilla
 Don Messick – Boo-Boo Bear, Pixie, Muttley, Lucky the Cat
 Neil Ross – Axel, Baba Looey
 Arnold Stang – Top Cat
 John Stephenson – Doggie Daddy
 Shadoe Stevens – Announcer
 Jean Vander Pyl – Winsome Witch
 Janet Waldo – Additional voices
 Paul Winchell – Dick Dastardly
 Patric Zimmerman – Augie Doggie, Dixie

See also
 List of works produced by Hanna-Barbera Productions
 List of Hanna-Barbera characters
 The Yogi Bear Show
 Top Cat
 The Quick Draw McGraw Show
 The Magilla Gorilla Show
 The Huckleberry Hound Show
 The Atom Ant/Secret Squirrel Show 
 Wacky Races

References

External links
 
 Toonarific.com entries:
 Fender Bender 500
 Monster Tails
 The Big Cartoon Database – Wake, Rattle, and Roll

1990 American television series debuts
1991 American television series endings
1990s American animated television series
1990s American anthology television series
1990s American children's comedy television series
American children's animated anthology television series
American children's animated comedy television series
American television series with live action and animation
American television shows featuring puppetry
English-language television shows
The Funtastic World of Hanna-Barbera
Television series by Hanna-Barbera
Crossover animated television series
Top Cat
Wacky Races spin-offs
Yogi Bear television series
Huckleberry Hound television series
Television series about children
Television series about robots